In 2008, there were 25 This American Life episodes.

External links
This American Lifes radio archive for 2008

2008
This American Life
This American Life